Equestrian at the 2014 Summer Youth Olympics was held from 19 to 24 August at the Nanjing International Exhibition Center in Nanjing, China.

Qualification

Each National Olympic Committee (NOC) can enter a maximum of 1 athlete. Athletes qualified into one of six zones (Europe, North America, South America, Asia, Australasia and Africa) containing five athletes. As hosts, China was automatically given a rider and up to 6 spots were available to the Tripartite Commission, though not all were used; this will cause a reduction from the zone quota depending which zone the chosen athlete is from. The remaining places were decided from qualification events or the 2013 FEI World Jumping Challenge (Category A) rankings. Should a zone not have enough athletes, the spot was filled by athletes from another zone.

To be eligible to participate at the Youth Olympics athletes must have been born between 1 January 1996 and 31 December 1997. Furthermore, all riders must have obtained a Certificate of Capability. The certificate must be obtained between 1 April 2013 and 31 May 2014 at a registered event.

Participating nations

Europe

North America
 
 
 *

South America

Asia

Australasia

Africa

Schedule

The schedule was released by the Nanjing Youth Olympic Games Organizing Committee.

All times are CST (UTC+8)

Medal summary

Medal table

Events

References

External links
Official Results Book – Equestrian 

 
2014 Summer Youth Olympics events
Youth Summer Olympics
2014
Equestrian sports in China